Into the Night is a 1985 American black comedy action thriller film directed by John Landis, starring Jeff Goldblum and Michelle Pfeiffer. The film has many cameo appearances made by various filmmakers and directors, including Landis himself. The soundtrack features the songs "Into the Night", "In the Midnight Hour" and "Lucille", performed by B.B. King.

Plot
Upon discovering that his wife is having an affair, aerospace engineer and depressed insomniac Ed Okin drives to LAX on his friend Herb's suggestion. There, he is surprised by a beautiful jewel smuggler, Diana, who jumps into his car and begs him to drive her away from four Iranians who are chasing her. She persuades him to drive her to various locations, and he becomes embroiled in her predicament. After becoming increasingly exasperated with her demands, he discovers that Diana has smuggled priceless emeralds from the Shah of Iran's treasury into the country, and is being pursued by a variety of assailants, including the aforementioned agents of a criminal Iranian expatriate and a British hitman.

The couple's caper gets increasingly out of hand, until Diana is eventually taken hostage by the thugs at the airport; here, Ed shares his ennui with the man holding a gun to Diana's head. The man shoots himself, instead. Taken to a motel room by federal agents, they are given a fortune in cash from one of Diana's wealthy friends via a federal agent. Diana showers and Ed finally sleeps. He wakes up after a full night's rest to an empty hotel room, with most of the money gone. However, when he leaves the room, Diana is waiting for him, with the money, a smile, and a request for a ride to the airport.

Cast
 Jeff Goldblum as Ed Okin
 Michelle Pfeiffer as Diana
 Richard Farnsworth as Jack Caper
 Irene Papas as Shaheen Parvici
 Kathryn Harrold as Christie
 Paul Mazursky as Bud Herman, the beachhouse owner and accused drug dealer
 Vera Miles as Joan Caper
 Roger Vadim as Monsieur Melville, the French kidnapper
 Clu Gulager as Federal Agent
 Dan Aykroyd as Herb
 David Bowie as Colin Morris
 Bruce McGill as Charlie
 Carl Perkins as Mr. Williams
 Stacey Pickren as Ellen Okin
 Carmen Argenziano as Stan
 David Cronenberg as Group Supervisor
 Domingo Ambriz as Taxi Driver
 Jake Steinfeld as Larry
 Art Evans as Jimmy
 John Hostetter as Aerospace Engineer
 Reid Smith as Sheriff Peterson

Cameo appearances
John Landis appears in the film as the mute member of the quartet of Iranian henchmen, alongside:
 Jack Arnold, director of science-fiction films, including It Came from Outer Space (1953), as the man with the dog in the elevator
 Rick Baker, Academy Award-winning make-up artist on An American Werewolf in London (1981), as the drug dealer
 Paul Bartel, director of low-budget films, including Eating Raoul (1982), as Beverly Wilshire Hotel doorman
 Jonathan Demme, who at the time had directed a number of lower-budget and exploitation films, as the thin federal agent with glasses
 Richard Franklin, Australian director of Roadgames (1981), as the aerospace engineer sitting next to Herb in the cafeteria
 Carl Gottlieb, who co-wrote Jaws (1975), as the large federal agent with moustache.
 Amy Heckerling, director of Fast Times at Ridgemont High (1982), as "Amy", the clumsy waitress.
 Jim Henson, creator of The Muppets, as the man on the phone talking to 'Bernie'.
 Colin Higgins, who wrote Harold and Maude (1971) and directed The Best Little Whorehouse in Texas (1982), as the actor in the hostage film
 Lawrence Kasdan, writer and director of Body Heat (1981), as the police detective who interrogates Bud
 Jonathan Lynn, co-writer of Yes, Minister, as the tailor who fits the SAVAK agents
 Andrew Marton, film director, as Freeway Driver
 Carl Perkins, musician, as Mr. Williams, assistant to Hamid.
 Daniel Petrie, director of A Raisin in the Sun (1961), as the director of the hostage film
 Dedee Pfeiffer, actress and sister of Michelle Pfeiffer, as the hooker
 Waldo Salt, Academy Award-winning screenwriter of Midnight Cowboy (1969) and Coming Home (1978), as the derelict who informs Ed of his car having been towed
 Don Siegel, director of Invasion of the Body Snatchers (1956) and Dirty Harry (1971), as the man caught with a girl in the hotel bathroom
 "Blue" Lou Marini, saxophonist, in the airport crowd

Members of the production crew also had cameos:
 Wes Dawn, makeup artist, and Christopher Dunn George, camera operator, appear as LAPD cops who remind Ed of the green light on his way to the airport
 Eddy Donno, stunt coordinator, as LAPD officer
 Sue Dugan, costumer, as Freeway Driver
 William B. Kaplan, sound mixer, David Sosna, assistant director, Saul Kahan, unit publicist, as grip, assistant director, and publicist of the hostage film
 Robert Paynter, director of photography, as Security Guard

Production
The film was greenlit by Sean Daniel, president of Universal; he was the executive who had championed Landis on National Lampoon's Animal House. Three weeks into the 60-day shoot,  Landis was ordered to stand trial for involuntary manslaughter arising out of the Twilight Zone shoot. Daniel told the press he thought Landis and his colleagues had been "unfairly sent to trial for what is obviously a human catastrophe, not a criminal act."

Critical reception 
Into The Night has a rating of 40% on Rotten Tomatoes, based on 25 critics' reviews, indicating a mixed critical reception. The critical consensus reads: "Despite its two stellar leads, Into the Night finds director John Landis indulging in far too many gimmicks in lieu of a well-rounded story." Vincent Canby in The New York Times wrote: "A little bit of Into The Night is funny, a lot of it is grotesque and all of it has the insidey manner of a movie made not for the rest of us, but for moviemakers on the Bel Air circuit who watch each other's films in their own screening rooms." He reserved praise, however, for the performances of the two leading actors: "Mr. Goldblum does little except react to the outrages of others, which he manages with a good deal of comic poise. Miss Pfeiffer, last seen as Al Pacino's cocaine-zonked wife in Scarface, is so beautiful that one is apt not to notice that she has the potential for being a fine comedienne." Variety held a similar view, writing that the "film itself tries sometimes too hard for laughs and at other times strains for shock", while also praising the performance of Jeff Goldblum, "nonetheless enjoyable as he constantly tries to figure out just what he's doing in all of this."

Some critics saw the large number of cameo appearances by Landis's friends and colleagues as unnecessary and distracting. Roger Ebert in the Chicago Sun-Times wrote: "If I had been the agent for one of the stars, like Goldblum, Michelle Pfeiffer, Richard Farnsworth, or Kathryn Harrold, I think I would have protested to the front office that Landis was engaging in cinematic autoeroticism and that my clients were getting lost in the middle of the family reunion." Time Out wrote: "The casting of innumerable major film-makers in small roles seems an unnecessary bit of elbow-jogging, but David Bowie makes an excellent contribution as an English hit man, and the two leading players are excellent: Pfeiffer in particular takes the sort of glamorous yet preposterous part that generally defeats even the best actress and somehow contrives to make it credible every inch of the way."

Despite negative reviews, John Landis is very pleased with the movie: "Into the Night was my first box-office failure, and that was quite surprising to me, because I hadn’t done anything different. It was dark. And that's another thing; critics don’t like it when you fuck with genre. It's the opposite of high concept. High concept is when you can explain [the movie] in one sentence, but when things get muddled, they’re confused. I like Into the Night.; It's got a wonderful cast."

Into The Night won the Special Jury Prize at the 1985 Festival du Film Policier de Cognac.

Soundtrack 
The score for Into the Night was written by Ira Newborn (tracks "Enter Shaheen" and "Century City Chase"). Newborn also composed two new songs for the film soundtrack, "Into the Night" and "My Lucille" (both performed by blues singer B.B. King) and also arranged the classic song "In the Midnight Hour". The vinyl edition of this soundtrack included two songs composed by Ira Newborn, which are not included on the film soundtrack: "Don't Make Me Sorry" (co-written by Joe Esposito), performed by Patti La Belle, and "Keep It Light" (co-written by Reginald "Sonny" Burke), performed by Thelma Houston. The official edition of the soundtrack also includes the songs "Let's Get It On", performed by Marvin Gaye (who was murdered by his father the previous year), and "I Can't Help Myself (Sugar Pie Honey Bunch)", performed by The Four Tops, both of which appeared during the film. No CD of this soundtrack has been issued, but all songs performed by B.B. King on the film soundtrack are available on Classic B.B.King CD (from "The Universal Masters Collection").

On the vinyl edition, John Landis quotes about the film soundtrack:

Track listing

Side one

 "Into the Night" (B.B. King)
 "My Lucille" (B.B. King)
 "In the Midnight Hour" (B.B. King)
 "Enter Shaheen" (Ira Newborn)
 "Century City Chase" (Ira Newborn)

Side two

 "Don't Make Me Sorry" (Patti La Belle)
 "Keep It Light" (Thelma Houston)
 "Let's Get It On" (Marvin Gaye)
 "I Can't Help Myself (Sugar Pie Honey Bunch)" (The Four Tops)

References

External links
 
 
 
 
 
Review of film at New York Times

1985 films
1980s black comedy films
1980s comedy thriller films
American comedy thriller films
Films directed by John Landis
Films produced by George Folsey Jr.
Films scored by Ira Newborn
Films set in Los Angeles
Films shot in Los Angeles
Insomnia in film
Universal Pictures films
1985 comedy films
1980s English-language films
1980s American films